The Oxford Almanack was an annual almanac published by the Oxford University Press for the University of Oxford from 1674 through 2019.

The Oxford University Press originally held a monopoly on publishing almanacs. The almanacs traditionally included engravings and information about Oxford University, including the Heads of Colleges and a university calendar. No almanack appeared in 1675, but it had been published annually since 1676.

Engravers and artists have included James Basire, Michael Burghers, J. M. W. Turner, and John Piper.

List of almanacks since 1992
Petter's The Oxford Almanacks lists the scenes depicted and their illustrators up to 1973, and the list is continued to 1991 in Bradshaw's article in Oxoniensia (see Further Reading for both references).

References

Further reading
 Helen Mary Petter, The Oxford Almanacks (Oxford: Clarendon Press, 1974)
 J.R. Bradshaw, 'A Classification by Subject of the Oxford Almanacks 1674-1991', Oxoniensia 56 (1991), pages 131-144
 Paul Luna & Martyn Ould, 'The Printed Page', chapter 17 in Ian Gadd (editor), The History of Oxford University Press. Volume I: Beginnings to 1780 (Oxford University Press, 2013), pages 520-527 (online with subscription)

1674 establishments in England
Publications established in 1674
Almanacs
Specific calendars
Almanack
Almanack
Almanack